The 1979 Clemson Tigers football team was an American football team that represented Clemson University in the Atlantic Coast Conference (ACC) during the 1979 NCAA Division I-A football season. In its second season under head coach Danny Ford, the team compiled an 8–4 record (4–2 against conference opponents), tied for second place in the ACC, lost to Baylor in the 1979 Peach Bowl, and outscored opponents by a total of 205 to 116. The team won the 300th game in Clemson history on September 22 and played its home games at Memorial Stadium in Clemson, South Carolina.

Bubba Brown and Billy Lott were the team captains. The team's statistical leaders included Billy Lott with 1,184 passing yards, Marvin Simms with 743 rushing yards, Perry Tuttle with 544 receiving yards, and placekicker Obed Ariri with 62 points scored (16 field goals, 14 extra points).

Schedule

Season summary

Duke

Roster

References

Clemson
Clemson Tigers football seasons
Clemson Tigers football